Prydz may refer to:

People
 Alvilde Prydz (1846–1922), Norwegian novelist
 Eric Prydz (born 1976), Swedish musician
 Frithjof Prydz (1943–1992), Norwegian ski jumper and tennis player
 Frithjof Prydz (judge) (1841–1935), Norwegian judge
 Hans Prydz (1868–1957), Norwegian politician
 Peter Blankenborg Prydz (1776–1827), Norwegian military officer

Other uses
 Prydz Bay, an embayment of Antarctica

See also